The Boston mayoral election of 1959 occurred on Tuesday, November 3, 1959, between former Boston City Council member John Frederick  Collins and President of the Massachusetts Senate John E. Powers. Collins was elected to his first term, and was inaugurated on Monday, January 4, 1960.

The nonpartisan municipal preliminary election was held on Tuesday, September 22, 1959.

Collins' victory was considered the biggest upset in city politics in decades. Boston University political scientist Murray Levin wrote a book on the race, titled The Alienated Voter: Politics in Boston, which attributed Collins' victory to the voters' cynicism and resentment of the city's political elite. Collins had been widely viewed as the underdog in the race and Powers had been regarded as the front-runner, making Collins' victory a political surprise. Collins had run on the slogan "stop power politics", and was widely seen as independent of any political machine.

Candidates
John F. Collins, Member of the Boston City Council from 1956 to 1957, member of the Massachusetts Senate from 1951 to 1955.
John E. Powers, member of the Massachusetts Senate since 1940, Senate President since 1959.

Candidates eliminated in preliminary
James W. Hennigan Jr., member of the Massachusetts Senate since 1955 and the Massachusetts House of Representatives from 1953 to 1955.
John P. McMorrow, member of the Boston School Committee.
Gabriel F. Piemonte, member of the Boston City Council since 1952 to 1959.

Results

See also
List of mayors of Boston, Massachusetts

References

Further reading

External links
 Boston Mayor Race - Nov 03, 1959 at ourcampaigns.com

Boston mayoral
Boston
Mayoral elections in Boston
Non-partisan elections
1950s in Boston